... Rage Before Beauty is a studio album by the English rock band Pretty Things, released in 1999.

Production
Ronnie Spector provided backing vocals on the band's cover of "Mony Mony". David Gilmour guested on "Love Keeps Hanging On". The album was produced by Mark St. John and Dave Garland. ... Rage Before Beauty was recorded by the 1966 lineup of the band.

Critical reception
Perfect Sound Forever called the album "a testament to the brand of sweaty, guitar-driven, R&B garage rock which never really seems to go out of fashion." The Boston Globe wrote that "vocalist Phil May's gravelly voice is stupefying on the Pretty's cover of 'Play With Fire', virtually besting Mick Jagger's own icy interpretation." The Orange County Register thought that "from the rollicking 'Passion of Love' to anthemic, reflective ballads like 'Love Keeps Hanging On' ... the album is a summation of almost every style the Pretties ever attempted, while still retaining some middle-age maturity."

Record Collector deemed it one of the band's "best ever recordings."

Track listing 
 "Passion of Love" (Phil May, Mark St. John) – 3:22
 "Vivian Prince" (May, Frank Holland, Jon Povey) – 5:15
 "Everlasting Flame" (May, Holland, St. John) – 3:46
 "Love Keeps Hanging On" (May) – 8:55
 "Eve of Destruction" (P. F. Sloan) – 3:03
 "Not Givin' In" (May) – 4:02
 "Pure Cold Stone" (May, Dick Taylor) – 5:47
 "Blue Turns to Red" (May, Holland) – 4:01
 "Goodbye, Goodbye" (May, Povey) – 2:45
 "Goin' Downhill" (May, Pete Tolson) – 4:12
 "Play with Fire" (Nanker Phelge) – 4:07
 "Fly Away" (May) – 4:30
 "Mony, Mony" (Tommy James, Bo Gentry, Ritchie Cordell, Bobby Bloom) – 4:45
 "God, Give Me the Strength (To Carry On)" (May, St. John) – 6:03

Personnel
Pretty Things
Phil May – vocals, acoustic guitar, harmonica
Dick Taylor – lead guitar, acoustic guitar
Frank Holland – lead guitar, acoustic guitar, vocals
Wally Waller – bass, acoustic guitar, vocals
Jon Povey – keyboards, vocals
Skip Alan – drums, percussion

Studio musicians
 Mark St. John – drums
Nick Brockway – Hammond organ
Steve Browning 
Robert Webb – keyboards
Nigel Ross-Scott – bass
David Gilmour – lead guitar on "Love Keeps Hangin' On"
Ronnie Spector – vocals on "Mony Mony"

References

1999 albums
Pretty Things albums